A México is a 1975 album by Julio Iglesias. It was released on the Alhambra label.

Track listing

Certifications and sales

References

Sources and external links
 Julio Iglesias Discography

1975 albums
Julio Iglesias albums
Spanish-language albums